The National Basketball Performance Centre (NPBC) is a 2,000 capacity, three-court basketball arena located in Manchester, England.

Background
Construction on the £11m Belle Vue Sports Village, including the 2,000 seat FIBA-standard arena, began in early 2015. The arena was funded by Manchester City Council, Basketball England and Sport England.

Tenants
In August 2016, it was announced that the Manchester Mystics were to relocate to the NPBC ahead of the 2016–17 WBBL season.

The NBPC is the home of the Basketball England age-group teams. The arena also hosts the governing body's end-of-season National Basketball League playoff finals.

In 2019, Manchester Thunder of the Netball Superleague began to play some home fixtures at the arena. From 2020, all Thunder home games will be played at the NBPC.

On 24 July 2020, it was announced that the Manchester Giants will play at the NBPC from the 2020–21 season.

International basketball matches

References

External links

Basketball venues in England
Indoor arenas in England
Sports venues in Manchester
Netball venues in England